Sardar Dur Muhammad Nasir (15 September 1958 – 8 June 2020) was a Pakistani politician who was a member of the Provincial Assembly of Balochistan, from May 2013 to May 2018.

Early life and education
He was born on 15 September 1958 in Duki District, Pakistan.

He has done Matriculation.

Political career
He was elected to the Provincial Assembly of Balochistan as a candidate of Pakistan Muslim League (N) from Constituency PB-14 Loralai-I in 2013 Pakistani general election.

Death
In 2020, Nasir contracted the COVID-19 during the COVID-19 pandemic in Pakistan. He isolated himself at his residence in Duki, but was later shifted to a hospital in Karachi when his condition deteriorated, where he died on 8 June.

References

2020 deaths
Balochistan MPAs 2013–2018
1958 births
Pakistan Muslim League (N) politicians
People from Duki District
Deaths from the COVID-19 pandemic in Sindh